Fan Zhengyi (born 27 January 2001)  is a Chinese professional snooker player. He won the IBSF World Under-21 Snooker Championship in 2017, and turned professional in 2018. He had a breakthrough season in 2021–22 when he reached his first ranking quarter-final at the 2022 German Masters and then won his first ranking title at the 2022 European Masters, defeating then six-time world champion Ronnie O'Sullivan 10–9 in the final. He became the fifth Chinese player to win a ranking title, following Ding Junhui, Liang Wenbo, Yan Bingtao, and Zhao Xintong.

Career
Fan started playing snooker at the age of 5 in Harbin. Just one year later he finished 5th in the National Youth Pool Championships. When he was 8 he finished 3rd in the National Youth Snooker Championships. A trip to Singapore at the age of 14 saw him reach the final of the 
2015 Cuesports Singapore Snooker Open, losing to experienced local player Marvin Lim 5–3, after taking a 2–0 lead.

Early career
In July 2017, Fan won five out of the last six frames to beat top seed Luo Honghao 7–6 and win the IBSF World Under-21 Snooker Championship at the tournament held in China. With this victory he was awarded a two-year Main Tour card for the professional snooker tour.

He competed at the 2018 World Snooker Team Cup representing China with Zhang Jiankang but they lost to India 2–3 in the Round of 16.

2018/2019
At just 17, Fan was the youngest player on the professional tour in 2018–19. His first match was a 4–1 loss to Jack Lisowski in the Riga Masters, and his first win was against his practice partner Lyu Haotian 6–5 in the International Championship. However, he could only manage one further win in the remainder of the season, which finished in a 10–5 loss to Chris Wakelin in the World Championship.

2019/2020
Fan played in the 2019 China National Championship in Xi'an, seeded number 3, but lost in the 3rd round to Jin Long 4–2. He did however achieve the highest break in the competition of 143.

Fan's best performance in the 2019–20 season came in the English Open. After a close win against Riley Parsons 4–3, he faced Chris Wakelin. At 3-3 the match ended on a respotted black in the final frame. After easy misses by both players Fan potted it to reach the last-32 for the first time. His run was ended by Shaun Murphy 4–0.

In subsequent tournaments Fan had further victories against Zhou Yuelong and Peter Lines. With the outbreak of COVID-19, the snooker season was suspended. Fan Zhengyi was one of only 4 Chinese players to stay in the UK, but was unable to practice due to lockdown restrictions. He played in the rescheduled World Championship, and beat amateur Dylan Emery 6–4 in the first round. He produced a fine attacking display in the second round against Dominic Dale, but eventually lost 6-4 after having led 4–3. Thus his season finished ranked 92, which meant he was relegated from the tour.

In an attempt to regain his Tour Card, Fan entered Q School. With 7 wins and no losses he was successful, beating two-time ranking event winner Michael White 4–2 in the final round, thus gaining entry to the 20-21 and 2021-22 snooker seasons.

2020/2021
Fan played in the very first match of the 2020-21 season, against Judd Trump in a Championship League group. He finished the group in 2nd place after beating David Lilley and drawing with Alan McManus. After that he had a run of 6 losses. His only win against a professional in match longer than best-of-5 frames was a 6-4 defeat of Zak Surety in the World Championship. He finished the season ranked 118.

2021/2022
After the 2021 season, Fan returned to China for the first time in 18 months. He played in the China City teams event in Xi'an, playing for the local Shaanxi team alongside Zhao Xintong and Li Hang. They were beaten in the quarter-final by eventual winners, Shanghai.

His 2021–22 professional season began with 4 losses and 1 win, against amateur David Lilley. Fan then produced his first win against a top-20 player, beating Thepchaiya Un-nooh 5–3 in the first round of qualifying for the German Masters. He followed this up with a 5–4 win over Lu Ning to qualify for the main event, held at the Tempodrom in Berlin. He defeated opponents including Liam Highfield and Andrew Higginson, before a 0–5 loss to Mark Allen in the quarter-finals.

In the European Masters, Fan produced his best performance to date in a ranking tournament, defeating opponents including Kyren Wilson, Yan Bingtao, David Gilbert, and Graeme Dott to reach his first ranking final. He faced six-time world champion Ronnie O'Sullivan. Fan took two-frame leads at 4–2, 6–4, and 8–6, but O'Sullivan recovered to draw level each time. Fan took a 9–8 lead, but O'Sullivan again drew level to force a deciding frame. After O'Sullivan missed a long red in the decider, Fan made a 92 break to win the match 10–9 for his first ranking title. Fan became the fifth Chinese player to win a ranking event, after Ding Junhui, Liang Wenbo, Yan, and Zhao Xintong.

Technique
Fan has a very unusual technique. He is very left-eye dominant, and when playing the shot, his cue is to the left of his head. Before turning professional, he was a member of the Wiraka Snooker Academy and was coached by former professional Roger Leighton.

Personal life
Fan was also a promising table tennis player, but decided to concentrate on snooker. He is also a cat-lover.

During his first three years as a professional, he made no century breaks, despite being known as a heavy scorer in junior and amateur tournaments in China. In an interview with Liu Song he revealed that he deliberately avoided making them, wanting his first professional century to be a 147. He nearly achieved this in the World Championship against Zak Surety, but missed a difficult 13th red to a baulk pocket with the remaining balls in good positions. After this, he abandoned the plan.

During the season, he lives in Sheffield and practices at the Victoria Academy. His main practice partners are Zhao Xintong and Yan Bingtao

Performance and rankings timeline

Career finals

Ranking finals: 1 (1 title)

Amateur finals: 2 (1 title)

References

External links
Fan Zhengyi at worldsnooker.com

Living people
Chinese snooker players
2001 births
Sportspeople from Harbin
21st-century Chinese people